Megapsammoecus is a genus of beetles in the family Silvanidae, containing the following species:

 Megapsammoecus christinae Karner, 1995
 Megapsammoecus inexpectatus Karner, 1995

References

Silvanidae genera